Alejandro Cabrera may refer to:

 Alejandro Cabrera (footballer) (born 1992), Argentine central midfielder
 Alejandro Cabrera (swimmer), Salvadoran swimmer